Allium gillii is a plant species found in Pakistan and Afghanistan. It is a bulb-forming perennial up to 35 cm tall, with an umbel of long-pediceled pale purple flowers.

References

gillii
Onions
Flora of Afghanistan
Flora of Pakistan
Plants described in 1959
Plants described in 1954